Gibberula ocellus is a species of sea snail, a marine gastropod mollusk, in the family Cystiscidae.

References

ocellus
Gastropods described in 1927